Philotheca virgata, commonly known as Tasmanian wax-flower, is a species of flowering plant in the family Rutaceae and is endemic to south-eastern Australia. It is a slender, erect shrub with wedge-shaped to oblong leaves and white or pale pink flowers at the ends of branchlets. It is the only philotheca with four sepals and petals.

Description

Taxonomy
Tasmanian wax-flower was first formally described in 1840 by Joseph Dalton Hooker from an unpublished description by Allan Cunningham who gave it the name Erisotemon virgatus. Hooker published the description in The Journal of Botany. In 1998, Paul Wilson changed the name to Philotheca virgata in the journal Nuytsia.

Distribution and habitat
Philotheca virgata grows in heathland and forest in coastal areas of southern and western Tasmania, south of Eden in New South Wales and in the extreme north east of Victoria.

References

virgata
Flora of Tasmania
Flora of New South Wales
Flora of Victoria (Australia)
Plants described in 1840
Sapindales of Australia
Taxa named by Joseph Dalton Hooker
Taxa named by Allan Cunningham (botanist)